Gen X usually refers to Generation X, the demographic coming after baby boomers but preceding Millennials.

Gen X may also refer to:
 Working title of Gen¹³
 GenX, a chemical process for producing Teflon and related chemicals, also used to refer to those chemicals
 GenX, an open source capacity expansion energy system model
 General Electric GEnx, an aircraft engine 
 Tata GenX Nano, an Indian compact car